"Through Being Cool" is a song by American new wave band Devo, written by Mark Mothersbaugh, Gerald Casale, and Bob Mothersbaugh. It appears on the album New Traditionalists (1981). The song was a direct attack on new fans who didn't understand Devo's message. The song was also featured in the 1981 animated film Heavy Metal as well as the 2005 superhero comedy Sky High, with the latter version performed by alternative rock band They Might Be Giants.
The song is also used as a throwback in NBA 2K8.

Record World said that "a boss bass groove sets the pace for dancers while the rhythm guitars add a funky flavor and keyboard melodies go after pop ears."

Promotional music video
The music video had Devo taking a limited role, focusing on a team of kids clad in Devo "Action Vests" attacking arrogant and ignorant people with "spudguns."

Chart performance

References

External links

1981 singles
1981 songs
Devo songs
They Might Be Giants songs
Songs written by Gerald Casale
Songs written by Mark Mothersbaugh
Warner Records singles